The Toogee were an Aboriginal Tasmanian people who lived in Western Tasmania, Australia, before European settlement. Their area of inhabitation included Macquarie Harbour.

The Toogee consisted of two different bands, the Lowreenne and Mimegin. They made stone tools, including those from Darwin Glass, a natural glass formed from a meteorite impact. The archeological record for this region goes back to 20,000 years ago with relics found in the Kutikina Cave.  They also left behind middens of shells along the coast.

The people living to the north near the Pieman River were the Peternidic band, and to the south near Port Davey was the Ninene.

A geological feature south of Tasmania is named after them, the Toogee sub basin. This is in the northernmost part of the South Tasman Rise, adjacent to the Lowreenne Massif.

See also

 Toogee language

Notes

Citations

Sources

Aboriginal peoples of Tasmania
South West Tasmania
Western Tasmania